Horst Tietzen (19 July 1912 – 18 August 1940) was a German Luftwaffe fighter pilot and recipient of the Knight's Cross of the Iron Cross during World War II.

Career
Tietzen was born 19 July 1912 at Arnswalde (today Choszczno in Poland). As a Leutnant, Tietzen served with 3. Staffel of Jagdgruppe 88 of the Condor Legion during the Spanish Civil War. He claimed his first air victory on 19 July 1938, downing a Republican I-16. He claimed a further six victories and was awarded the Spanienkreuz in Gold. On 1 November 1939, Tietzen was appointed Staffelkapitän (squadron leader) of the newly created 5. Staffel (5th squadron) of Jagdgeschwader 51 (JG 51—51st Fighter Wing). The Staffel had been created in August 1939 as the Reservestaffel (reserve squadron) of Jagdgeschwader 71 (JG 71—71st Fighter Wing).

He shot down a French Bloch MB.174 bomber for his first victory of World War II on 20 April 1940. He recorded his 17th victory on 25 July 1940, a Spitfire near Dover. On 15 August Tietzen shot down three Hurricanes. He became the fourth German fighter pilot to record 20 victories on 18 August. However, on the same day, he was shot down in aerial combat with Royal Air Force Hurricane fighters over the Thames Estuary. His victors were Flying Officer Stefan Witorzenc and Pilot Officer Pawel Zenker from No. 501 Squadron who reported two Messerschmitt Bf 109 fighters shot down between Canterbury and Westgate-on-Sea which crashed near the North Goodwin Lightship. His body later washed ashore at Calais in France. Tietzen now rests at the Bourdon German war cemetery. He was posthumously awarded the Knight's Cross of the Iron Cross on 20 August 1940.

Summary of career

Aerial victory claims
According to Obermaier, Tietzen was credited with 27 aerial victories, seven in the Spanish Civil War and 20 on the Western Front of World War II. Mathews and Foreman, authors of Luftwaffe Aces — Biographies and Victory Claims, researched the German Federal Archives and found documentation for 24 aerial victory claims, plus further three unconfirmed claims. This number of confirmed claims includes seven claims during the Spanish Civil War and 17 over the Western Allies.

Awards
 Spanish Cross in Gold with Swords (14 April 1939)
 Iron Cross (1939) 2nd and 1st Class
 Knight's Cross of the Iron Cross on 20 August 1940 as Hauptmann and Staffelkapitän of 5./Jagdgeschwader 51

Notes

References

Citations

Bibliography

 
 
 
 
 
 
 
 
 
 
 Die Wehrmachtberichte 1939-1945 Band 1, 1. September 1939 bis 31. Dezember 1941 (in German). München: Deutscher Taschenbuch Verlag GmbH & Co. KG. 1985. .

1912 births
1940 deaths
People from Choszczno County
People from the Province of Brandenburg
German World War II flying aces
Recipients of the Knight's Cross of the Iron Cross
Luftwaffe personnel killed in World War II
Aviators killed by being shot down
German military personnel of the Spanish Civil War
Spanish Civil War flying aces
Condor Legion personnel
Burials at Bourdon German war cemetery